Yaldili is a village and municipality in the Yevlakh Rayon of Azerbaijan.  It has a population of 1,315.

References

External Links 

Populated places in Yevlakh District